The Ice Cream Show is a television series about ice cream. It premiered on Viceland in 2018.

Episodes

See also
 List of programs broadcast by Viceland

References

2018 American television series debuts
Ice cream
Viceland original programming